The 1896 Limerick Senior Hurling Championship was the eighth staging of the Limerick Senior Hurling Championship since its establishment by the Limerick County Board in 1887.

St. Michael's were the defending champions.

On 22 November 1896, Caherline won the championship after a 2-06 to 2-01 defeat of Ballingarry in the final. It was their first championship title.

Results

Final

References

Limerick Senior Hurling Championship
Limerick Senior Hurling Championship